(Main list of acronyms)


 c – (s) Centi
 C – (s) Carbon – Coulomb – One Hundred (in Roman numerals)

C0–9
 C2 or C2 – (i) Command and Control
 c2c – (s) the British rail company formerly known as LTS Rail
 C2C
 (p) Coast to Coast Athletic Conference
 Consumer-To-Consumer electronic commerce
 Cam-To-Cam internet chat
 C2D or C2D – (i) Intel Core 2 Duo
 C2IEDM or C2IEDM – (i) Command and Control Information Exchange Data Model
 C2IS or C2IS – (i) Command and Control Information System
 C2PC or C2PC – (i) Command and Control Personal Computer
 C2V or C2V – (i) Command and Control Vehicle
 C2W or C2W – (i) Command and Control Warfare
 C3 or C3
 (i) Colorectal Cancer Condition
 Command, Control, and Communications
 C3I or C3I – (i) Command, Control, Communications, and Intelligence
 C4 or C4 – (i) Command, Control, Communications, and Computers
 C4I or C4I – (i) Command, Control, Communications, Computers, and Intelligence
 C4ISR or C4ISR – (i) Command, Control, Communications, Computers, Intelligence, Surveillance and Reconnaissance

CA
 ca – (s) Catalan language (ISO 639-1 code)
 Ca – (s) Calcium
 CA
 (s) California (postal symbol)
 Canada (FIPS 10-4 country code; ISO 3166 digram)
 Catalonia
 (i) Civil Affairs
 Close Armour
 Cocaine Anonymous
 Computer Associates
 Counter-Air
 Cricket Australia
 CAA
 (i) Canadian Automobile Association
 (NORAD) Center for Aerospace Analysis
 (U.S.) Center for Army Analysis
 (U.S.) Clean Air Act
 (U.S. Army) Concepts Analysis Agency
 Civil Aviation Authority
 Colonial Athletic Association
 CAAT
 (i) or (a) Campaign Against Arms Trade
 Center for Alternatives to Animal Testing
 CAC
 (i) California Association of Criminalists
 Chronic Asymptomatic [Disease] Carrier
 CACM 
 (i) Central American Common Market
 (i) Communications of the ACM
 CAD
 (s) Canadian dollar (ISO 4217 currency code)
 (a) Computer-Aided Design
 Computer-Aided Dispatch
 Cpplint Anxiety Disorder - (a) Condition suffered by software developers who worry about whether they've left any whitespace on the end of a line
 CADCAM – (a) Computer-Aided Design/Computer-Aided Manufacturing
 CADMID – (a) Concept, Assessment, Demonstration, Manufacture, In service, Disposal (life cycle mnemonic)
 CADPAT – (p) CAnadian Disruptive PATtern
 CADT – Child/Adolescent Day Treatment
 CAE
 (i) Canadian Aviation Electronics (originally)
 Certificate in Advanced English
 CAEn – (i/a) Close Action Engagement (constructive simulation)
 CAF
 (s) Central African Republic (ISO 3166 trigram)
 (i) Confederation of African Football (or French Confédération Africaine de Football)
 CAFAD – (a) Combined Arms For Air Defence
 CAFDE
 (a) Canadian Association of Film Distributors and Exporters
 Computer Aided Federation Development Environment
 CAFE – (a) Corporate Average Fuel Economy standard
 CAI – (i) Computer Assisted Instruction
 CAIR – (i) Council on American-Islamic Relations
 Calabarzon – (p) A region in the Philippines: CAvite, LAguna, BAtangas, Rizal, queZON
 CALL – (a) (U.S.) Center for Army Lessons Learned
 CALM – (p) Communications, Air-interface, Long and Medium range
 CalPERS – (p) California Public Employees' Retirement System
 CalSTRS – (p) California State Teachers' Retirement System
 Caltrans – (p) California Department of Transportation
 CAM
 (a) Chemical Agent Monitor
 Complementary and alternative medicine
 Computer-Aided Manufacturing
 Crassulacean acid metabolism (type of photosynthesis)
 CAMRA – (p) CAMpaign for Real Ale
 CAN – (s) Canada (ISO 3166 trigram)
 CANA – (a) Convulsive Antidote, Nerve Agent
 CANDU – (p) CANada Deuterium Uranium (nuclear reactor design)
 Canola – (p) Canadian oil, low acid (referring to a specific cultivar of rapeseed bred to have a low erucic acid content)
 CAP
 (i) Combat Air Patrol
 Civil Air Patrol
 Common [Operating/Operational] Air Picture
 Crisis Action Procedures
 Common Agricultural Policy (European Union)
 CAPES
 (p) CAPability Evaluation System
 (a) Combined Arms Planning and Execution System
 CAQ – (i) Coalition Avenir Québec (French, "Coalition for Québec's Future"; political party in that Canadian province)
 CARB (i) – California Air Resources Board
 CARE
 (a) Citizens Association for Racial Equality (former New Zealand organisation)
 (p) Community database on Accidents on the Roads in Europe
 (a) Cooperative for Aid and Relief Everywhere (originally Cooperative for American Remittances to Europe)
 CARMONETTE – (p) Computerized Monte Carlo Simulation
 CARP – (a) Computed Air Release Point
 CART – (a) Championship Auto Racing Teams (now defunct)
 CAS
 (i) Chemical Abstracts Service
 Chief of the Air Staff
 Close Air Support
 CASA –(a) Civil Aviation Safety Authority
 CASE
 (a) Cellular ammunition storage equipment
 Computer-Aided Software Engineering
 CASS – (a) Command Activated Sonobuoy System
 CASTFOREM – (p) Combined Arms and Support Task FORce Evaluation Model
 CASTOR – (a) Canadian Automatic Small Telescopes for Orbital Research
 cat – (s) Catalan language (ISO 639-2 code)
 CAT
 (a) Community Acceptance Testing
 Computer-Assisted (or Axial) Tomography
 CATK – (p) Counterattack
 CATS – (a) Computer Active Technology Suspension
 CATT – (a/i) Combined Arms Tactical Trainer
 CAV – (p) Cavalry
 CAVOK – (p) Ceiling And Visibility OK ("Kav-okay")
 CAW – (i) Canadian Auto Workers (trade union)

CB
 CB
 (i) Citizens' Band radio
 (s) Cambodia (FIPS 10-4 country code)
 CBASSE – (a) Commission on Behavioral And Social Sciences and Education ("sea bass")
 CBC
 (i) Canadian Broadcasting Corporation
 Christmas Bird Count
 Cipher-Block Chaining
 Cornering Brake Control
 CBE
 (i) Commander of the Order of the British Empire
 Cab Beside Engine (see truck)
 CBF – (i) Confederação Brasileira de Futebol (Portuguese, "Brazilian Football Confederation")
 CBGB – (i) Country, Blue Grass, and Blues (former New York City nightclub)
 CBLA – (i) Comparative bullet lead analysis
 CBN – CardsApp Brand Number
 CBM – many, including Canadian Baptist Ministries and Commodore Business Machines; see entry
 CBML – (i) Coalition Battle Management Language
 CBOL – (i) Consortium for the Barcode of Life
 CBOT – (i) Chicago Board of Trade
 CBP – (i) (U.S.) Customs and Border Protection
 CBR – (i) Case-Based Reasoning
 CBRE
 (i) Canadian Brotherhood of Railway Employees
 Certified Broadcast Radio Engineer (U.S. professional certification)
 Chemical, Biological, Radiological and Explosive Defence Group (Singapore)
 Coldwell Banker Richard Ellis
 CBRN – (i) Chemical, Biological, Radiological, or Nuclear (weapon or event)
 CBRNE – (i) Chemical, Biological, Radiological, Nuclear or [high-yield] Explosive (weapon or event)
 CBS
 (i) Columbia Broadcasting System
 Corps Battle Simulation
 CBT
 (i) Cock and Ball Torture
 (i) Cognitive Behaviour Therapy
(p) Combat
 CBUS – (i) Columbus, Ohio

CC
 CC – many, including carbon copy; see entry
 CCA – (i) Counter Command Activity
 CCCAA – (p/i) California Community College Athletic Association (usually pronounced "3C-2A")
 CCC
 CCC - (p/i) Coricidin Cough & Cold
 CCC
 (i) Canterbury Clothing Company
 Civilian Conservation Corps (U.S., 1930s and 1940s)
 Corpus Christi College, Oxford
 CCCP
 (i) Central Committee of the Communist Party
 Cyrillic for SSSR (Soyuz Sovetskikh Sotsialisticheskikh Respublik, Russian Союз Советских Социалистических Республик, Union of Soviet Socialist Republics)
 CCD
 (i) Charge-Coupled Device
 Confraternity of Christian Doctrine (Catechism)
 CCF – (i) Cartoon Cartoon Fridays
 CCG
 (i) Canadian Coast Guard
 Collectible Card Game
 CCGC
 (i) Canadian Coast Guard Cutter
 Canadian Coast Guard College
 CCGH – (i) Canadian Coast Guard Hovercraft
 CCGS
 (i) Canadian Coast Guard Ship
 Christ Church Grammar School
 CCH – (i) Computer-Controlled Hostile
 CCIF – (p) Comité consultatif international des communications téléphoniques à grande distance (French for International Telephone Consultative Committee, merged with the CCIT in 1956 to form the CCITT)
 CCII
 (i) Command and Control Information Infrastructure
 Community Capital Investment Initiative
 CCIR
 (i) Comité consultatif international pour la radio (French for Consultative Committee on International Radio, became the ITU Radiocommunication Sector, ITU-R, in 1992)
 commander's critical information requirement
 CCIT – (p) Comité consultatif international télégraphique (French for International Telegraph Consultative Committee, merged with the CCIF in 1956 to form the CCITT)
 CCITT – (p) Comité consultatif international téléphonique et télégraphique (French for International Telegraph and Telephone Consultative Committee, became the ITU Telecommunication Standardization Sector, ITU-T, in 1992)
 CCK
 (p) Cholecystokinin
 (s) Cocos (Keeling) Islands (ISO 3166 trigram)
 CCM
 (i) Canada Cycle & Motor Co. Ltd. (now split into two separate companies bearing the CCM name, one manufacturing bicycles and the other ice hockey equipment)
 Contemporary Christian music
 Cape Cod Mall
 CCOC
 (i) Canadian Children's Opera Chorus
 CCOP – (i) Coalition Common Operating/Operational Picture
 CCP
 (i) Casualty Collection Point
 Communications Checkpoint
 Contingency Communications Package
 CCPA – (i) Consumer Credit Protection Act
 CCR
 (i) Covenants, conditions, and restrictions (related to real estate, especially in the US)
 Creedence Clearwater Revival
 CCRAp – (p) Canadian Conservative Reform Alliance party
 CCRP – (i) Command and Control Research Program
 CCRTS – (i) Command and Control Research and Technology Symposium
 CCSCS – (a) Coordinadora de Centrales Sindicales del Cono Sur
 CCSCS – (i) Consultative Committee for Space Data Systems
 CCSIL – (i) Command and Control Simulation Interface Language ("cecil")
 CCSK – (i) Cyclic Code Shift Keying
 CCT – (i) Current Commitments Team
 CCTT – (i) Close Combat Tactical Trainer

CD
 cd – (s) Candela
 Cd – (s) Cadmium
 CD – many, including Compact Disc; see entry
 CD1 – (i) Cluster of Differentiation 1 (a small gene family)
 CDA – (i) UK Centre for Defence Analysis
 CDC
 (i) Centers for Disease Control and Prevention (originally (U.S.) Communicable Disease Center)
 Control Data Corporation
 Cult of the Dead Cow
 CDD – (i) Capabilities Development Document
 CDE – (i) Chemical Defence Equipment
 CDEC – (i) U.S. Combat Development Experimentation Center
 CDF
 (i) California Department of Forestry [and Fire Protection]
 Common Data Format
 (s) Democratic Republic of Congo franc congolais (ISO 4217 currency code)
 CDIAC – (a) Carbon Dioxide Information Analysis Center ("see-dee-ack")
 CDipAF – (i) Certified Diploma in Accounting and Finance
 CDL – (i) Commercial driver's license
 CDM
 (i) Clean Development Mechanism (Kyoto protocol)
 Cold Dark Matter (astronomy)
 CDMA – (i) Code Division Multiple Access
 CDMO – (i) Contract Developpement & Manufacturing Organizations 
 CDMSII – (p) Cryogenic Dark Matter Search II
 CDMX – (p) Ciudad de México, the Spanish name of Mexico City
 Cdr – (p) Commander
 CDS
 (i) Chief of the Defence Staff
 Credit default swap
 Cdt – (p) Commandant
 CDT – (i) Central Daylight Time (UTC−5 hours)

CE
 ce – (s) Chechen language (ISO 639-1 code)
 Ce – (s) Cerium
 CE – many, including Christian/Common Era (cf. AD); see entry
 CEA – (i) Campaign Effectiveness Analysis
 CECOM – (p) U.S. Army Communications and Electronics Command
 CEDEX – (p) Courrier d'entreprise à distribution exceptionnelle (French, "Company Mail with Exceptional Distribution"; "exceptional" refers to the volume of mail)
 CEGEP – (p) Collège d'enseignement général et professionnel (French, "College of General and Vocational Education")
 CEI – (i) Competitive Enterprise Institute
 CENTCOM – (p) United States Central Command
 CENTO – (a) Central Treaty Organization (Baghdad Pact)
 CENZUB – (p) Centre d'entraînement aux actions en zone urbaine (French, "Urban Operations Training Centre")
 CEO – (i) Chief Executive Officer
 CEP – (i) Circular Error Probable
 CEPT – (a/i) Conférence européenne des administrations des postes et des télécommunications (French, "European Conference of Postal and Telecommunications Administrations")
 CERCLA – (a) U.S. Comprehensive Environmental Response, Compensation, and Liability Act of 1980  (Superfund)
 CERDEC – U.S. Communications-Electronics Research, Development and Engineering Center
 CERGA – (a) Centre de recherches en géodynamique et astrométrie (French, "Astrometry and Geodynamics Research Centre")
 CERN – (a) Centre européen pour la recherche nucléaire (French, "European Organization for Nuclear Research")
 CERT – (a) Computer Emergency Response Team
 ces – (s) Czech language (ISO 639-2 code)
 CESS – (i) Centre for Earth Science Studies (India)
 CEV
 (i) Combat Engineer Vehicle
 Confédération européenne de volleyball (French, "European Volleyball Confederation")
 Crew Exploration Vehicle
 CEWC – (a/i) Council for Education in World Citizenship

CF
 cf. – (i) confer (Latin "compare", or "see also")
 Cf – (s) Californium
 CF
 (i) Canadian Forces
 (s) Central African Republic (ISO 3166 digram)
 Republic of the Congo (FIPS 10-4 country code)
 CFA
 (i) Cat Fanciers' Association
 Chartered Financial Analyst
 College Football Association (former consortium of US major college football conferences)
 Color Filter Array
 County Fire Authority
 Covering Force Area
 CFAR
 (i) Christine's
 Federal Acquisition Regulation
 CFC
 (i) ChloroFluoroCarbon
 Canadian Fish Company
 CFES – (a) Continuous Flow Electrophoresis System
 CFFZ – (i) Call For Fire Zone
 CFG
 (i) Context-free grammar
 Control-flow graph
 CFHT – (i) Canada–France–Hawaii Telescope
 CFI – (i) Center for Inquiry (CSICOP)
 CFL
 (i) Canadian Football League
 Co-ordinated Fire Line
 CFLCC – (i) Coalition Forces Land Component Command
 CFM – (i) Certified Facilities Manager [(IFMA)]http://www.ifma.org/
 CFO – (i) Chief Financial Officer
 CFP
 (i) Call for papers
 College Football Playoff
 Common Fisheries Policy (EU)
 CFR
 (i) Code of Federal Regulations
 Căile Ferate Române (Romanian, "Romanian Railways")
 CFRP – (i) Carbon fibre reinforced plastic
 CFS – (i) Chronic Fatigue Syndrome
 CFSP – (i) Common Foreign and Security Policy
CFU – (i) Colony Forming Unit(s) in Microbiology
 CFV – (i) Cavalry Fighting Vehicle
 CFZ – (i) Critical Friendly Zone

CG
 CG –  (i) Client Group – Computer Graphics – Controls Group – (s) Democratic Republic of the Congo (FIPS 10-4 country code) – Republic of the Congo (ISO 3166 digram)
 CGDC – (i) Computer Game Developers Conference (became GDC in 1998)
 CGF – (i) Computer-Generated Forces (Simulation)
 CGH – (i) Comparative Genomic Hybridisation
 CGIG – (i) Cross-Government Implementation Group
 CGM – (i) Computer Graphics Metafile
 CGO – (s) Republic of the Congo (IOC and FIFA trigram, but not ISO 3166)
 CGS – (i) Chief of the General Staff
 CGSI – Consumer Guidance Society of India
 CGT – (i) Capital Gains Tax

CH
 ch – (s) Chamorro language (ISO 639-1 code)
 ch – ch(L) is used to denote the Chern character of a line bundle
 CH
 (p) Chieftain tank
 (s) China (FIPS 10-4 country code)
 Switzerland (ISO 3166 digram; from Latin Confoederatio Helvetica)
 cha – (s) Chamorro language (ISO 639-2 code)
 CHAMPUS – (a) (U.S.) Civilian Health and Medical Program of the Uniformed Services (now known as TRICARE)
 CHAOS – (a) Cambridge Heart Anti-Oxidant Study
 CHAPS – (a) Clearing House Automated Payment System
 CHDK – (i) Canon Hack Development Kit (Canon camera firmware hack)
 che – (s) Chechen language (ISO 639-2 code)
 CHE – (s) Switzerland (ISO 3166 trigram; from Latin Confoederatio Helvetica)
 CHF – (s) Swiss franc (ISO 4217 currency code)
 CHI
 Catholic Health Initiatives (US hospital network)
 (s) Chile (IOC and FIFA trigram, but not ISO 3166)
 (i) Columbia Helicopters, Inc
 Computer-Human Interaction
 CHiP – (a) California Highway Patrol
 CHIPS – (a) Cosmic Hot Interstellar Plasma Spectrometer
 CHL – (s) Chile (ISO 3166 trigram)
 CHLA – (a) Core Historical Literature of Agriculture
 CHN – (s) China (ISO 3166 trigram)
 CHOGM – (a) Commonwealth Heads of Government Meeting
 CHP
 (i) California Highway Patrol
 Combined Heat and Power
 CHPSO – (a) California Hospital Patient Safety Organization
 CHRS – Canadian Heart Rhythm Society
 CHS – (i) Combat Health Support
 CHT – (i) Certified Hand Therapist
 chu – (s) Old Church Slavonic language (ISO 639-2 code)
 chv – (s) Chuvash language (ISO 639-2 code)
 CREN – (p) Christian Real Estate Network Real Estate Association

CI
 Ci – (s) Curie
 CI
 (s) Chile (FIPS 10-4 country code)
 Côte d'Ivoire (ISO 3166 digram)
 (i) Counter-Intelligence
 101 (in Roman numerals)
 CIA
 (i) Cairo International Airport
 Central Intelligence Agency
 Cru' in Action
 Culinary Institute of America
 CIAO
 (i) Critical Infrastructure Assurance Office
 Component-Integrated ACE ORB
 CIB – (i) Complete In Box (Internet auction/trading listings)
 CIBC – (i) Canadian Imperial Bank of Commerce
 CICS – (a) Customer Information Control System (IBM mainframe software; "kicks" or "C-I-C-S")
 CID
 (i) Certified Interior Designer (New York State professional licensing designation)
 (p) Combat Identification
 (i) Criminal Investigation Division
 Criminal Investigations Department
 CIÉ – (i) Commission internationale de l'éclairage
 CIEF – (i) Comité international d'enregistrement des fréquences (International Frequency Registration Board)
 CIF
 (i) California Interscholastic Federation (high school sports governing body)
 Cost, Insurance, and Freight (Paid) (shipping)
 CIMIC – (p) Civil-Military Co-operation
 CIMMYT – (a/i) Centro Internacional de Mejoramiento de Maíz Y Trigo (Spanish, "International Maize and Wheat Improvement Center")
 CINC – (p) Commander in Chief
 CINEOS – (a) Campo Imperatore Near-Earth Object Survey
 CIO
 (i) Chief information officer
 Congress of Industrial Organizations
 CIP – (a) Combat Identification Panel
 CIPE – (i) (European) Centre for International Political Economy
 CIR – (i) (Commander's) Critical Information Requirements
 CIR – (s) Corotating Interaction Region
 CIS
 (i) Canadian Interuniversity Sport, a former name of the organization now known as U Sports
 Commonwealth of Independent States
 Command and Information System
 Communication and Information System
 CISA – (a) (U.S.) C4I Integration Support Activity
 CISB – (i) Complete In Sealed Box (Internet auction/trading listings)
 CISPR – (i) Comité international spécial des perturbations radioélectriques (Special International Committee on Radio Interference)
 CISSP – (i) Certified Information Systems Security Professional
 CITES – (p) Convention on International Trade in Endangered Species (of Wild Fauna and Flora) ("sigh-tease")
 CITS – (i) Combat Identification Training System
 CIV – (s) Côte d'Ivoire (ISO 3166 trigram)
 CIVETS – (a) Colombia, Indonesia, Vietnam, Egypt, Turkey, South Africa (economics)
 CIVPOP – (p) Civilian Population
 CIWS – (i) Close-In Weapon System

CJ
 CJ
 (s) Cayman Islands (FIPS 10-4 country code)
 (i) Criminal Justice
 CJC
 (i) Canadian Jewish Congress
 Cold Junction Compensation
 CJD
 (i) Chronological Julian Day
 Creutzfeldt–Jakob disease
 CJCS – (i) Chairman of the Joint Chiefs of Staff
 CJO – (i) Chief of Joint Operations
 CJTF – (i) Combined Joint Task Force

CK
 CK – (s) Cocos (Keeling) Islands (FIPS 10-4 country code) – Cook Islands (ISO 3166 digram)
 CKA – (i) commonly known as, (a) Canada Kicks Ass
 CKND – Codename: Kids Next Door

CL
 Cl – (s) Chlorine
 CL – (s) Chile (ISO 3166 digram) – (i) Co-ordination Line – One Hundred and Fifty (in Roman numerals)
 CLA – (i) Clutterers Anonymous
 CLEC – (i) Competitive Local Exchange Carrier
 CLEMARS – (a) California Law Enforcement Mutual Aid Radio System
 CLI – (i) Command Line Interface/Interpreter
 CLIC – (p) Compact LInear Collider
 CLO – (i) Cornell Lab of Ornithology
 CLOB – (p) Character Large OBject
 CLOS – (i) Command to Line-Of-Sight (missile control system)
 CLOS – (a) Common Lisp Object System
 CLP – (s) Chilean peso (ISO 4217 currency code) – (i) Common [Operating/Operational] Land Picture
 CLPFC – (i) CentroLateral PreFrontal Cortex
 CLRP – (a) College Loan Repayment Program

CM
 Cm – (s) Curium
 CM
 (s) Cameroon (FIPS 10-4 country code; ISO 3166 digram)
 (i) Cruise Missile
 (s) Nine Hundred (in Roman numerals)
 CMA
 (i) U.S. Chemical Materials Agency
 Country Music Association (also used to refer to the organization's annual awards)
 Crystal Meth Anonymous
 CMB – (i) Cosmic Microwave Background
 CMBR – (i) Cosmic Microwave Background Radiation
 CME – (a) Coronal Mass Ejection (usually Sun)
 CMHC – (i) Canada Mortgage and Housing Corporation
 CMIIAW – (i) Correct me if I am wrong
 CMIS
 (a) Content Management Interoperability Services
 Common management information service
 CMJ – (i) Christopher Martin-Jenkins (BBC sports commentator)
 CML
 (p) Chemical
 (i) Chronic Myelogenous Leukemia (formerly Chronic Myeloid Leukemia)
 CMLL – (i) Consejo Mundial de Lucha Libre (Spanish, "World Wrestling Council"—Mexican professional wrestling promotion)
 CMM – (i) Capability Maturity Model
 CMMC – (i) Corps Materiel Management Centre
 CMML
 (i) Chronic MyeloMonocytic Leukemia
 Continuous Media Markup Language
 CMO – (i) Civil-Military Operations
 CMOC – (i) Civil-Military Operations Centre
 CMOS
 (i) Canadian Meteorological and Oceanographic Society
 (The) Chicago Manual of Style
 Complementary Metal Oxide Semiconductor
 CMP – (i) Common [Operating/Operational] Maritime Picture
 CMP – (i) Canadian Military Pattern truck (World War II)
 CMPD
 (i) Chronic Myeloproliferative Disease
 (i) Charlotte-Mecklenburg Police Department
 (i) Costa Mesa Police Department
 CMR
 (s) Cameroon (ISO 3166 trigram)
 (i) Coaxial Main Rotors (helicopter type)
 CMS
 (i) Centers for Medicare and Medicaid Services
 The Chicago Manual of Style
 CMT – (i) Country Music Television
 CMU
 (i) Carnegie Mellon University
 Central Michigan University
 Concrete Masonry Unit
 CMW
 (i) Marconi's Wireless Telegraph Company of Canada
 Canadian Manufacturing Week
 Canadian Music Week
 Catherine McAuley Westmead (school in New South Wales, Australia)
 Chicago, Missouri and Western (Railway)
 Compartmented Mode Workstation
 Compton's Most Wanted
 Continuous Microwave (processing technology)
 Custom Maintenance Wizard (Microsoft Office Resource Kit)
 CMYK – (i) Cyan Magenta Yellow Key/blacK (color model)

CN
 CN
 (i/s) Canadian National (railway; also the AAR reporting mark for said company)
 (s) China (ISO 3166 digram)
 Comoros (FIPS 10-4 country code)
 CNA
 (i) Center for Naval Analyses
 Certified Network Administrator
 Computer Network Attack
 Continental (Casualty Company), National (Fire Insurance Company), and American (Casualty Company), the three companies that merged to form what is now known as CNA Financial
 CNBC – (a/i) Consumer News and Business Channel
 CND
 (i) Campaign for Nuclear Disarmament
 Computer Network Defence
 CNE
 (i) Canadian National Exhibition
 Computer Network Exploitation
 Certified Network Engineer
 CNES – (i) Centre national d'études spatiales (French, "National Centre for Space Studies")
 CNF – (p) Cost and Freight
 CNI – (i) Communications, Navigation and Identification
 CNI – (a) Clinical Nursing Intern
 CNN
 (i) Cable News Network
 Cellular Nonlinear Network
 CNO – (i) Computer Network Operations
 CNR
 (i) Canadian National Railway
 Combat Net Radio
 CNV – (i) Copy-Number Variable (genetics)
 CNY – (s) Chinese yuan renminbi (ISO 4217 currency code)

CO
 c/o – (i) care of (postal code indicating temporary address change)
 co – (s) Corsican language (ISO 639-1 code)
 Co – (s) Cobalt
 Co. – Company
 CO – many, including Central Office (phone company); see entry – (s) Colorado (postal symbol) – (i) Commanding Officer (military)
 COA – (i) Certificate/Concept Of Analysis – Course Of Action (military)
 COB – (i) Close Of Business [day]
 COBOL (p) – COmmon Business-Oriented Language
 COBRA – Consolidated Omnibus Budget Reconciliation Act of 1985 
 COCOM – (p) Combatant Command (military)
 COD – (i) Cash On Delivery – (s) Democratic Republic of the Congo (ISO 3166 trigram)
 CoDA – (i) Co-Dependents Anonymous
 codec – (p) Coder-Decoder / Compressor-Decompressor / Compression-Decompression algorithm
 COE – (i) Cab Over Engine (see truck) – Common Operating Environment (military)
 COEA – (i) Cost Operational Effectiveness Analysis (military)
 COEIA – (i) Combined Operational Effectiveness and Investment Appraisal (military)
 C of I – (i) Certificate of Indebtedness (financial) – (i) The College of Idaho
 COFT – (i) Conduct Of Fire Trainer (military)
 COG – (i) Centre Of Gravity – Current Operations Group (military) – (s) Republic of the Congo (ISO 3166 trigram)
 COGENT – (a) Cognitive Objects within a Graphical EnviroNmenT
 COIL – (a) Chemical Oxygen Iodine Laser
 COIN – (p) Counter-Insurgency (military)
 COK – (s) Cook Islands (ISO 3166 trigram)
 COL – (s) Colombia (ISO 3166 trigram)
 COLA – (a) comp.os.linux.announce – Cost Of Living Adjustment
 COLT – (a) Combat Observation and Lasing Team (military)
 COM – (s) Comoros (ISO 3166 trigram) – (a) Component Object Model
 COMECON – (p) Council for Mutual Economic Assistance (economic counterpart of the Warsaw Pact, 1949–1991)
 COMMZ – (p) Communications Zone (military)
 COMSEC – (p) Communications Security (military)
 CONAD – (p) U.S. Continental Air Defense Command
 CONCACAF – (a) Confederation Of North, Central American and Caribbean Association Football
 CONMEBOL – (p) Confederación Sudamericana de Fútbol or Confederação Sul-Americana de Futebol (respectively Spanish and Portuguese for "South American Football Confederation")
 CONOPS – (p) Concept of Operations (military)
 CONUS – (p) Continental United States
 COO – (i) Chief Operating Officer
 COP – (s) Colombian peso (ISO 4217 currency code) – (a) Common Operating/Operational Picture
 COPD –(i) Chronic obstructive pulmonary disease
 COPE – (a) U.K. Committee On Publication Ethics
 COPUS – (p) U.K. Committee on the Public Understanding of Science
 cor – (s) Cornish language (ISO 639-2 code)
 CORBA – (a) Common Object Request Broker Architecture
 CORD – (i/a) Common Operational Requirements Document
 CORE – (a) Consortium for Oceanographic Research and Education
 CORG – (i) (U.S.) Combat Operations Research Group
 COROT – (p) COnvection, ROtation and planetary Transits
 cos – (s) Corsican language (ISO 639-2 code) – Cosine
 COS – (i) Cooper Ornithological Society
 COSCOM – (p) Corps Support Command (military)
 COSER – (p) COoperative SERvice
 COSHH – (p) Control Of Substances Hazardous to Health (United Kingdom)
 CoSIDA – (p) College Sports Information Directors of America, the original name of the organization now known as College Sports Communicators
 CoT – (i) Car of Tomorrow (former NASCAR race car design)
 COTS – (a) Commercial Off The Shelf
 COVID-19 – Coronavirus disease 2019
 Coy – (s) Company (military unit)Cow

CP
 CP
 (i) Canadian Pacific
 Check Point
 Command Post
 Club Penguin
 CPA – (i) Certified Public Accountant
 CPAC
 (p) Conservative Political Action Conference
 Cable Public Affairs Channel ("see-pack")
 CPAP
 (i) Center for Public Administration and Policy
 Coalition for the Prevention of Alcohol Problems
 Consecutive primes in arithmetic progression
 (p) Continuous positive airway pressure ("see-pap")
 CPC – Certified Professional Coder, a certification from AAPC
 CPCU – Certified Property Casualty Underwriter
 CPD – (i) Capabilities Production Document
 CPE
 (i) Certificate of Proficiency in English
 Certified Professional Ergonomist
 (i) Clinical Pastoral Education
 CPEC – (p) China–Pakistan Economic Corridor ("see-pec")
 CPF
 (i) Calibration Parameter File
 Canadian Patrol Frigate
 CPG – (a) Clinical Practice Guideline
 CPI – (i) CERDEC Command, Power and Integration
 CPIM – (a) Certification on Production and Inventory Management
 CPIR – Computationally-Private Information Retrieval
 CPON – (i) Certified Pediatric Oncology Nurse
 CPPCC – (i) Chinese People's Political Consultative Conference
 CPR – (i) Canadian Pacific Railway
 CPR – (i) Cardiopulmonary resuscitation
 CPSM – (i) Continuous Phase Shift Modulation
 CPSU – (i) Communist Party of the Soviet Union
 CPT – (i) Contingency Planning Team
 CPU
 (i) Central Processing Unit
 Contract Postal Unit
 CPV – (s) Cape Verde (ISO 3166 trigram)
 CPX – (p) Command Post eXercise

CQ
 CQ – (i) Carrier Qualification – Central Queensland –  Charge of Quarters – Congressional Quarterly – Constellation Airlines (IATA airline designator) – Northern Mariana Islands (FIPS 10-4 territory code)
 CQD – (i) Close Quarters Drill (Morse distress code preceding SOS: CQ "calling all stations", D "Distress"; often incorrectly interpreted as "Come Quick, Distress")

CR
 cr – (s) Cree language (ISO 639-1 code)
 Cr – (s) Chromium
 CR
 (s) Coral Sea Islands (FIPS 10-4 territory code)
 Costa Rica (ISO 3166 digram)
 CRAM – (i) Combined Radiometric Correction Model
 CRC
 (i) Central RTI Component
 Chemical Rubber Company
 Christian Reformed Church
 Control and Reporting Centre
 Cyclic Redundancy Check
 (s) Costa Rican colón (ISO 4217 currency code)
 Costa Rica (IOC and FIFA trigram, but not ISO 3166)
 CRD – (i) Capstone Requirements Document
 cre – (s) Cree language (ISO 639-2 code)
C.R.E.A.M. –Cash Rules Everything Around Me
 CREB – (a) Cyclic AMP-response Element Binding (protein)
 CREEP – (a) Committee for the Re-Election of the President, a pejorative nickname used by opponents
 CRI
 (a) China Radio International
 (s) Costa Rica (ISO 3166 trigram)
 CRIPL – (i) Consolidated Remain-In-Place List
 CRISPR – (a) clustered regularly interspaced short palindromic repeats
 CRM – (i) Cardiac Rhythm Management – Customer Relationship Management
 CRO – (s) Croatia (IOC and FIFA trigram, but not ISO 3166) – Contract Research Organization
 CRP
 (i) Committee for the Re-Election of the President
 Control and Reporting Post
 CRT
 (i) Cardiac Resynchronization Therapy
 Cathode Ray Tube
 Chinese Remainder Theorem
 CRTC – (i) Canadian Radio-television and Telecommunications Commission

CS
 cs – (s) Czech language (ISO 639-1 code)
 Cs – (s) Caesium
 CS
 (i) Combat Support
 Computer Scientist
 Counter-Strike
 (s) Costa Rica (FIPS 10-4 country code)
 Serbia and Montenegro (ISO 3166 digram; obsolete since 2006)
 CSA
 (i) Canadian Soccer Association
 Canadian Space Agency
 Canadian Standards Association
 Chief Scientific Advisor
 Child Support Agency
 Command Staff Advisor
 Community-supported agriculture
 Confederate States of America
 Corps Storage Area
 (p) Czech Airlines
 C/S/A – (i) CINC, Service, and Agency
 CSAR – (p) Combat Search and Rescue ("seessar")
 CSC
 (i) Closed Spacelike Curve (relativity)
 College Sports Communicators (U.S. organization for college sports information directors)
 Compact system camera
 Computer Sciences Corporation (became DXC Technology in 2017)
 Computer Security Centre
 CSCC Canadian Society of Clinical Chemists 
 CSEAL – (i/a) Combat Systems Engineering and Analysis Laboratory ("see-seal")
 CSERIAC – (p) (U.S. DoD) Crew Systems Ergonomics Information Analysis Center
 CSG – (i) Corps Support Group
 CSI – see entry
 CSICOP – (i) Committee for the Scientific Investigation of Claims of the Paranormal (became the Committee for Skeptical Inquiry in 2006)
 CSIP – (i) Commercial Stable Image Platform (AMD)
 CSIS
 (p) Canadian Security Intelligence Service ("seessiss")
 (i) (U.S.) Center for Strategic & International Studies
 CSK – (s) Czechoslovakia (ISO 3166 trigram; obsolete since 1993)
 CSL – (i) U.K. Central Science Laboratory
 CSM – see entry
 C-SPAN – (i) Cable-Satellite Public Affairs Network
 CSPI – (i) Center for Science in the Public Interest
 CSR – (i) Control Supply Rate
 CSR – (i) Corporate Social Responsibility 
 CSRC – (i) Conflict Studies Research Centre
 CSRF – (i) Cross-Site Request Forgery
 CSS
 (i) Cascading Style Sheets
 Catalina Sky Survey
 Central Security Service
 Combat Service Support
 Confederate States Ship
 Content-scrambling system
 Cross-site scripting
 CSSCS – (i) Combat Service Support Control System
 CST – (i) Central Standard Time (UTC−6 hours)

CT
 CT – (i) Computed tomography (medical scan also known as a CAT scan) – Central Time zone – Chrono Trigger (Computer/Video games) – (s) Connecticut (postal symbol) – Canterbury (postal symbol) – Chhattisgarh (Indian state code)
 CTA
 (s) Central African Republic (FIFA trigram, but not ISO 3166 or IOC)
 (i) Chicago Transit Authority
 (i) Comando-Geral de Tecnologia Aerospacial (Portuguese, [Brazilian] "General Command for Aerospace Technology")
 CTBT – (i) Comprehensive [Nuclear] Test Ban Treaty
 CTC – (i) Closed Timelike Curve (relativity) – (U.S.) Combat Training Center
 CTDB – (i) Compact Terrain Data Base (file format)
 CTE
 (s) Canton and Enderbury Islands (ISO 3166 trigram; obsolete 1984)
 (i) Chronic traumatic encephalopathy
 CTGF – (i) connective tissue growth factor
 CTI – (i) Co-operative Target Identification
 CTIL – (i) Critical Tracked Items List
 CTIS – (i) Central Tire Inflation System
 CTMS – (i) Clinical Trial Management System
 CTO – (i) Chief Technical Officer – Chief Technology Officer
 CTS – (i) Clear-To-Send – Collective Training Standards –  Communications Technology Service – Contract Technical Services – Conversation Time Sharing – COSMIC Top Secret
 CTSS – (i) Compatible Time-Sharing System
 CTU – (i) Counter Terrorist Unit (fictional branch of the Central Intelligence Agency in the television action series 24)
 CTVT – (i) Canine Transmissible Venereal Tumour

CU
 cu – (s) Old Church Slavonic language (ISO 639-1 code)
 Cu – (s) Copper (Latin Cuprum)
 CU
 (i) Carrie Underwood
 (s) Cuba (FIPS 10-4 country code; ISO 3166 digram)
 (i) University of Colorado Boulder
 CUB – (s) Cuba (ISO 3166 trigram)
 CUCV – (i) Commercial Utility Cargo Vehicle
 CUDAAP –(a) Custom Database Applications
 CUNY – (a) City University of New York ("CUE-knee")
 CUP – (s) Cuban peso (ISO 4217 currency code)
 CUPE – (a) Canadian Union of Public Employees ("CUE-pee")
 CUPS – (a) Common Unix Printing System
 CUPW – (i) Canadian Union of Postal Workers
 CUREA – (a) Consortium for Undergraduate Research and Education in Astronomy
 CuW – (s) Copper-tungsten pseudo-alloy (from the chemical symbols of the two component elements)
 CUW – (s) Curaçao (ISO 3166 trigram)

CV
 cv – (s) Chuvash language (ISO 639-1 code)
 CV – many, including curriculum vitae (résumé); see entry
 CVCC
 (i) Combat Vehicle Command and Control
 Compound Vortex Controlled Combustion (1970s Honda automobile engine technology)
 CVE – (s) Cape Verde escudo (ISO 4217 currency code)
 CVI – (i) Combat Vehicle Identification
 CVLL – (i) Crypto Variable Logic Label
 CVR – (i) Cockpit Voice Recorder – Combat Vehicle Reconnaissance
 CVR(T) – (i) Combat Vehicle Reconnaissance (Tracked)
 CVS – (i) Concurrent Versions System
 CVSD – (i) Continuous Variable Slope Delta (modulation)
 CVT – (i) Continuously Variable Transmission

CW
 CW
 (i) Continuous Wave
 (s) Cook Islands (FIPS 10-4 territory code)
 (i) Clothes washer
 (i) The CW
 CW/CE – (i) Construction Worker / Construction Electrician IBEW
 CWC – (i) Chemical Weapons Convention
 CWL – (i) Campus Wide Login
 CWS – (i) Canadian Wildlife Service
 CWRU – (i) Case Western Reserve University

CX
 CX – (s) Christmas Island (ISO 3166 digram) – One Hundred and Ten (in Roman numerals)
 CXR – (s) Christmas Island (ISO 3166 trigram)

CY
 cy – (s) Welsh language (ISO 639-1 code)
 CY – (i) Calendar year – (s) Cyprus (ISO 3166 and FIPS 10-4 country code digram)
 cym – (s) Welsh language (ISO 639-2 code)
 CYM – (s) Cayman Islands (ISO 3166 trigram)
 CYP – (s) Cyprus (ISO 3166 trigram) – Cyprus pound (ISO 4217 currency code)

CZ
 CZ
 (i) combat zone
 (s) Czech Republic (ISO 3166 and FIPS 10-4 country code digram)
 CZE – (s) Czech Republic (ISO 3166 trigram)
 CZK – (s) Czech koruna (ISO 4217 currency code)
 CZF – constructive Zermelo-Fraenkel
 CZMA – (i) (US) Coastal Zone Management Act
 CZW – (i) Combat Zone Wrestling

See also

Acronyms C